Asvestochori is a small town and a community of the Pylaia-Chortiatis municipality. Before the 2011 local government reform it was part of the municipality of Chortiatis, of which it was a municipal district. The 2011 census recorded 6,393 inhabitants in the community. The community of Asvestochori covers an area of 34.344 km2.

Under the Turkish rule name of the town was called Kireç (lit. lime). It is reported that during the Population exchange between Greece and Turkey a guest house that can accommodate 5000 immigrants was built by Red Crescent in Kireç.

See also
 List of settlements in the Thessaloniki regional unit

References

Populated places in Thessaloniki (regional unit)